Peace in The Valley: The Complete Gospel Recordings is a triple-CD compilation album by Elvis Presley, released in 2000.

In January 2001 the album debuted at number 13 on Billboards Top Contemporary Christian album chart. At the time it was Presley's highest ever entry on the chart.

On March 8, 2018, the album was awarded a Gold certification by the RIAA for selling in excess of 500,000 units.

Track listing

Disc 1

Disc 2

Disc 3

Personnel 
 The Jordanaires
 The Imperials
 The Nashville Edition
 J.D. Sumner & The Stamps
 The Sweet Inspirations
 Kathy Westmoreland
 Sherrill Nielsen

Million Dollar Quartet 
 Elvis Presley
 Carl Perkins
 Jerry Lee Lewis
 Johnny Cash

References 

2000 compilation albums
Elvis Presley compilation albums
RCA Records albums
Compilation albums published posthumously